Alberta Provincial Highway No. 3A, commonly referred to as Highway 3A, is the designation of four alternate routes of Highway 3 in southern Alberta, Canada.  All four segments are former alignments of Highway 3, also known as the Crowsnest Highway.

Lundbreck

From west to east, the first segment of Highway 3A begins west of the Highway 3 intersection with Highway 22, east of Burmis, and ends east of the same intersection with Highway 22, west of Lundbreck.  This  segment crosses the Crowsnest River and provides a viewing opportunity of Lundbreck Falls. The highway was formed in 1967 when Highway 3 was realigned across a new bridge Crowsnest River.

Monarch

The highway was commissioned in 1996 when Highway 3 was twinned and realigned in the area.

Major intersections

Lethbridge

The third segment of Highway 3A provides access to West Lethbridge.  It diverges from Highway 3 southeast of Coalhurst, in the form of a Y interchange running for only  in the Lethbridge County before ending at Lethbridge city limits and continuing as Westside Drive; essentially the area inside the provincially maintained interchange right-of-way, and is unsigned. It is a remnant of a larger  route that followed present-day Westside Drive and Bridge Drive and was the original western approach the Highway 3 bridge over the Oldman River; it was commissioned in 1966 when Highway 3 twinned and realigned. All but the extreme western portion of the route was decomissied when the area was annexed by the City of Lethbridge in the mid-1980s.

Barnwell

The fourth and easternmost segment is also an original alignment of Highway 3, passing through the centre of Barnwell.  The town was bypassed to the south in 2000 when twinning of Highway 3 was extended to Taber.

References 

003A
Transport in Lethbridge